Gianbattista Baronchelli (born 6 September 1953) is an Italian retired professional road racing cyclist (1974–1989). He obtained a total of 94 victories.

Baronchelli was born in Ceresara, in the Province of Mantua. In 1973, as an amateur, he won the Tour de l'Avenir and the Baby Giro, and he was thought destined to win the Giro d'Italia. Although he knew the director of the Molteni team, they did not sign him, as they already had Eddy Merckx as their team captain, so Baronchelli signed a contract at the SCIC team.

He was overall second at the Giro d'Italia in 1974 and 1978, and third in 1977. His other main accomplishments were a silver medal at the 1980 World Championships and two victories at the Giro di Lombardia (1977 and 1986).

Baronchelli started in the Tour de France twice, in 1976 and 1979, but both times did not finish the race.
He won the Giro dell'Appenino six times in succession from 1977 to 1982.

Major victories
Amongst Baronchelli's victories are:
2 x Giro di Lombardia (1977, 1986)
6 x Giro dell'Appennino (1977, 1978, 1979, 1980, 1981, 1982) (record)
Tour de Romandie (1977)
2 x Giro del Piemonte (1978, 1980)
2 x Giro di Romagna (1976, 1979)
Giro dell'Emilia (1980)
Tour of the Basque Country (1976)
Rund um den Henninger-Turm (1980)
Giro del Lazio (1981)
2 x Giro di Toscana (1981, 1984)
Tour de l'Avenir (1974)
Trofeo Laigueglia (1975)
Coppa Placci (1978)
Giro della Provincia di Reggio Calabria (1980)
Coppa Sabatini (1980)
Trofeo Baracchi (1975, with Francesco Moser)
4 stages in the Giro d'Italia
1 stage in the Vuelta a España

References

Italian male cyclists
Cyclists from the Province of Mantua
1953 births
Living people
Italian Giro d'Italia stage winners
Italian Vuelta a España stage winners